Sardar Shahjahan Yousuf ) is a Pakistani politician who has been a Member of the National Assembly of Pakistan from 2002 to 2013.

Political career
He was elected to the National Assembly of Pakistan from NA-20 (Mansehra-I) as candidate of Pakistan Muslim League (Q) (PML-Q) in 2002 Pakistani general election.

He was re-elected to the National Assembly of Pakistan from NA-20 (Mansehra-I) as candidate of Pakistan Muslim League (Q) (PML-Q) in 2008 Pakistani general election. In 2011, he was inducted into the federal cabinet of Prime Minister Yousaf Raza Gillani as minister of state for Production. In 2012, he was inducted into the federal cabinet of Prime Minister Raja Pervaiz Ashraf as minister of state.

References

Living people
Pakistani MNAs 2002–2007
Pakistan Muslim League (Q) MNAs
People from Mansehra District
Pakistani MNAs 2008–2013
Year of birth missing (living people)